Butterwick is a village and former civil parish, now in the parish of Foxholes (1.75 miles to the east, near the village of Weaverthorpe (2 miles to the west), in the Ryedale district of North Yorkshire, England. The village lies in the Great Wold Valley and the course of the winterbourne stream the Gypsey Race passes through it. Until 1974 the village lay in the historic county boundaries of the East Riding of Yorkshire. In 1931 the parish had a population of 77.

Butterwick is a small village and only contains about 13 to 15 houses. It has a church dedicated to St Nicholas, and several farming families. The closest school is Weaverthorpe Primary about 1 mile away. It is approximately 9 miles from Driffield, 10 miles from Bridlington, 15 miles from Scarborough and 35 miles from York.

History 
The name "Butterwick" means 'Butter specialised-farm'. Butterwick was formerly a township in the parish of Foxholes, from 1866 Butterwick was a civil parish in its own right until it was abolished to create Foxholes parish on 1 April 1935.

References

Villages in North Yorkshire
Former civil parishes in North Yorkshire
Ryedale